Dainik Hindusthan is a Marathi language daily newspaper in India. It was established in the year 1947 at Amravati, Maharashtra by the Late Shri Balkrishana Vishnu Marathe.

External links

Marathi-language newspapers
Publications established in 1947
1947 establishments in India
Daily newspapers published in India